Alcyoneus is a low-excitation, Fanaroff–Riley class II radio galaxy located  away from Earth, corresponding to the galaxy SDSS J081421.68+522410.0. It is located in the constellation Lynx and it was discovered in Low-Frequency Array (LOFAR) data by a team of astronomers led by Martijn Oei. For comparison, another similarly sized giant radio galaxy is 3C 236, with lobes 15 million light-years across.

Aside from the size of its radio emissions, the central galaxy is otherwise of ordinary radio luminosity, stellar mass, and supermassive black hole mass. The galaxy was named after the giant Alcyoneus from Greek mythology.

Discovery
Alcyoneus had been first reported in a paper published in February 2022 by Martijn Oei and colleagues after obtaining results from the Low Frequency Array (LOFAR) Two-metre Sky Survey (LoTSS), an interferometric radio survey of the Northern Sky. The object was first observed as a bright, three component radio structure visible on at least four spatial resolutions of the LoTSS (6, 20, 60, and 90 arcminute resolutions). The two outer components of the radio structure are separated by a similar distance to the smaller, elongated radio structure, signifying their nature as possible radio lobes. Further confirmations using radio-optical overlays dismiss the possibility of the two being separate radio lobes from different galaxies, and confirm that they have been produced by the same source.

Characteristics

Alcyoneus has been described as a giant radio galaxy, a special class of objects characterized by the presence of radio lobes generated by relativistic jets powered by the central galaxy's supermassive black hole. Giant radio galaxies are different from ordinary radio galaxies in that they can extend to much larger scales, reaching upwards to several megaparsecs across, far larger than the diameters of their host galaxies. In the case of Alcyoneus, the host galaxy does not host a quasar and is relatively quiscient, with spectral imaging from the Sloan Digital Sky Survey's 12th data release (SDSS DR12) suggesting a star formation rate of only 0.016 solar masses per year. This classifies it as a low excitation radio source, with Alcyoneus obtaining most of its energy due to relativistic process of the central galaxy's jet rather than radiation from its active galactic nucleus.

The central host galaxy of Alcyoneus has a stellar mass of 240 billion solar masses, with its central supermassive black hole estimated to have a mass of  million solar masses; both characteristically typical for elliptical galaxies, but substantially lower values than other similar galaxies hosting giant radio sources.

It is currently unknown how Alcyoneus's radio emissions grew so large. A few theories have been proposed, including a lesser dense than usual environment surrounding it, the fact that it exists inside a filament of the cosmic web, a supermassive black hole, an extensive stellar population, and powerful jet streams.

See also 

 List of largest galaxies
 Hercules A
 Cygnus A
 List of galaxies with notable features

Notes

References

Radio galaxies
Active galaxies
Astronomical radio sources
Lynx (constellation)